The 1991 Shell Rimula X season was the 7th season of the franchise in the Philippine Basketball Association (PBA).

Draft picks

Runner-up finish
The defending champions in the First Conference with five-time best import Bobby Parks back anew as expected finish on top of the eliminations with eight wins and three losses. Shell clinch the first finals berth on April 23 with its 12th win in 16 outings, a 141-124 victory over Diet Sarsi. The Turbo Chargers dropped their last three semifinal matches entering the championship rematch with Ginebra San Miguel. 

Shell won Game one, halting the Ginebras' seven-game win streak in the semifinals and the first four games of the title-series went the same pattern as last year with the Turbo Chargers winning Games three and four to take a 3-1 lead in the best-of-seven series. In Game five, Shell was leading 85-80 in the first four minutes of the final quarter when Ginebra unleashed a 30-0 bomb to win going away and with the momentum on Ginebra's side, Shell lost Game six and the final game of the series.

Occurrences
The Turbo Chargers went down to one victory and six losses during the All-Filipino Conference and coach Arlene Rodriguez' contract was not renewed.  The team's trainer Hercules Callanta took over from Rodriguez in their remaining assignments.

Ginebra assistant coach Rino Salazar accepted the offer of Shell to become their new head coach beginning the Third Conference.

Notable dates
July 11: Shell romped off with a convincing 105-96 win over Alaska Milk for only their second win in eight outings in the All-Filipino Conference.  

September 29: After losing their first three games in the Third Conference, the Turbo Chargers finally gave their new coach Rino Salazar his first win, a 104-92 victory over Alaska Milkmen. 

October 20: Shell blew a 21-point lead early in the final quarter but recovered in time to turn back Ginebra San Miguel, 126-120, and keep its slim, semifinal hopes alive. Michael Morrison, who was actually Shell's original choice for an import but was unavailable before the conference started, scored 39 points as he combined with Benjie Paras and Romy Dela Rosa for 94 points out of Shell's total output of 126.

Roster

Transactions

Additions

Recruited imports

References

Shell Turbo Chargers seasons
Shell